Abdi Mohamed Kusow is a Somali scholar and writer.

He studied at Michigan State University, where he obtained a Bachelor of Arts in 1990. Kusow later earned a Master of Urban Planning (M.U.P.) from the University of Michigan Taubman College of Architecture and Urban Planning in 1992. He also holds a Ph. D. in sociology from Wayne State University (Dissertation, 1998 :"Migration and Identity process among Somali Immigrants in Canada").

Kusow is currently professor of sociology at Iowa State in Ames, Iowa.

Bibliography
Kusow has published numerous books and scholarly articles over the years.

Books
2004	Kusow, Abdi M. (ed.). 2004. Putting the Cart Before the Horse: Contested Nationalism and the Crisis of the Nation-State in Somalia, Trenton, NJ: The Red Sea Press.

Refereed articles/Book chapters
1993	Kusow, Abdi M. 1993. "The Role of Shelter in Generating Income Opportunities for Poor Women in the Third World." pp. 218–224 in Women, Shelter, and Development, edited by Hemalata Dandekar. Ann Arbor: Wehr Publications.
1994	Kusow, Abdi. "The Genesis of the Somali Civil War: A New Perspective." Northeast African Studies 1: 3-46.
1995	Kusow, Abdi M. "The Somali Origin: Myth or Reality."Pp.81-106 in The Invention of Somalia, edited by Ali. J. Ahmed. Trenton, NJ: Red Sea Press.
1995	Kusow, Abdi M. "Peace and Stability in Somalia." UFAHAMU: Journal of the African Activist Association 22: 25-40.
1997	Kusow, Abdi, Leon Wilson, and David Martin. 1997. "Determinants of Citizen Satisfaction with Police Performance: The Effects of Residential Location." Policing: An International Journal of Police Strategies and Management 4:655-664.
2001	Maines, David and Abdi Kusow. 2001 "Somali Migration to Canada and Resistance to Racialization." pp. 135–162 in The Faultline of Consciousness: A View of Interactionism in Sociology, New York: Aldine De Gruyter.
2001	Kusow, Abdi. 2001. "Stigma and Social Identities: The Process of Identity Work among Somali Immigrants in Canada." pp. 152–182 in Variations on the Theme of Somaliness, edited by M. S Lilius. Turku, Finland: Center for Continuing Education, Abo University Press.
2003	Kusow, Abdi M. 2003. "Beyond Indigenous Authenticity: Reflections on the Insider/Outsider Debate in Immigration Research," Symbolic Interaction 26: 591-599.
2004	Kusow, Abdi M. 2004. "Contested Narratives and the Crisis of National Identity: A Prolegomenon."  pp. 1–14 in Putting the Cart Before the Horse: Contested Nationalism and the Crisis of the Nation-State in Somalia, edited by Abdi M. Kusow. Trenton, NJ: The Red Sea Press.
2004	Kusow, Abdi M. 2004. "Preface." Pp. xi-xvii in Putting the Cart Before the Horse: Contested Nationalism and the Crisis of the Nation-State in Somalia, edited by A M. Kusow. Trenton, NJ: The Red Sea Press.
2004	Kusow, Abdi M. 2004. "Contesting Stigma: On Goffman's Assumptions of Normative Order," Symbolic Interaction 27:179-197. (in the top 20 most read articles in Symbolic Interaction).
2006	Kusow, Abdi M. 2006. "Migration and Racial Formations among Somali Immigrants in North America." Journal of Ethnic and Migration Studies 32: 533-551.
2007	Kusow, Abdi M. "Stigma," in The Encyclopedia of Sociology, edited by George Ritzer.  Oxford UK: Blackwell, forthcoming.
2007	Ajrouch, Kristine, and Abdi Kusow. "Racial and Religious Contexts: Situational Identities among Lebanese and Somali Muslim Immigrants in North America." Ethnic and Racial Studies 30:72-94.
2007	Kusow, Abdi M. "East African Immigrants in the United States," in The New Americans: A Handbook to Immigration Since 1965, edited by Mary Waters and Reed Ueda. Cambridge: Harvard University Press, forthcoming.

Research reports/published proceedings
1993	Kusow, Abdi M. "Prospects and Perspectives on Conflict Resolution in Somalia," Proceedings of the 7th International Conference on the Horn of Africa, Center for the Study of the Horn of Africa, Queens College/CUNY, New York, 14-20.
1993	Kusow, Abdi M. "Power Struggles and Continued Human Suffering in Somalia," Proceedings of the Symposium on Human Disaster and World Politics, Institute for African Development, Cornell University, Ithaca, NY, 1993.
1993	Muktar, M. and Abdi Kusow, "The Boonka Conference and Beyond: An Investigation of the Bottom Up Grass-roots Reconciliation Process of the Clan Elders of Southern Somalia," Life and Peace Institute, Uppsala, Sweden, 1993.
2006	Mohamud, S. Abdinur, and Abdi M. Kusow. "Why Somalia Continues to Remains a Failed State." African Renaissance 3: 13-23

References

Living people
Ethnic Somali people
Somalian writers
Somalian sociologists
Somalian scientists
Somalian non-fiction writers
Oakland University faculty
Michigan State University alumni
Taubman College of Architecture and Urban Planning alumni
Wayne State University alumni
Somalian scholars
Somalists
American people of Somali descent
Year of birth missing (living people)